Aber may refer to:

Places
 Aber and Inver (placename elements)
 Aber, Ceredigion
 Abergwyngregyn, popularly known by the short form "Aber"
 Aberystwyth, popularly known by the short form "Aber"
 Aber Village, Powys, Wales
 Abergavenny, Monmouthshire, Wales

Transport
 Aber railway station, on the Rhymney Line serving the town of Caerphilly, south Wales, United Kingdom
 Aber railway station (Gwynedd), disused railway station on the North Wales Coast Line in Caernarfonshire, Wales, United Kingdom

Other uses
 Aber (name), a given name and surname
 Aberystwyth University, sometimes colloquially known as "Aber"
 Dominion Diamond Mines, a Canadian diamond mining company, formerly known as Aber

See also
Aber Isle, a small island in Loch Lomond, Scotland